William Matt Torrens (19 October 1869 – 18 February 1931) was an English cricketer.  Torrens was a right-handed batsman who fielded as a wicket-keeper.  He was born at Sundridge Park, Kent, and educated at Harrow School.

Torrens made his first-class debut for Kent against Gloucestershire in 1890.  He made three further first-class appearances for Kent in that season, the last of which came against the touring Australians.  In his four first-class matches, he scored a total of 86 runs at an average of 14.33, with a high score of 43.

He died at Westminster, London on 18 February 1931.  His father, Alfred, and brother, Attwood both played first-class cricket.

References

External links

1869 births
1931 deaths
People from Bromley
People educated at Harrow School
English cricketers
Kent cricketers
Wicket-keepers